Epididymis-specific alpha-mannosidase is an enzyme that in humans is encoded by the MAN2B2 gene.

Epididymis-specific alpha-mannosidase precursor

Mannosidase alpha class 2B member

core-specific lysosomal alpha-1,6-Mannosidase

epididymis-specific alpha-mannosidase

mannosidase, alpha, class 2B, member

References

Further reading